Elections to Watford Borough Council were held on 6 May 2010. Three years in every four, a third of the council (13 councillors) retires and elections are held (in the fourth year, elections are held for county councillors). The council election was held on the same day as the national General Election, when the Labour Party government lost power and the Watford parliamentary constituency was won by the Conservative Party.

In this council election, the Labour Party gained one seat and the Liberal Democrats lost one. However. the Liberal Democrats remained firmly in control of the council.

After the election, the composition of the council was:
Liberal Democrat 25
Conservative 4
Labour 4
Green 3

Council election result

Mayoral election

2010

Ward results

References

2010 English local elections
May 2010 events in the United Kingdom
2010
2010s in Hertfordshire